Rodrigo Álvaro Tello Valenzuela (born 14 October 1979) is a Chilean former professional footballer. He operated mainly as a left midfielder, but could also appear in the middle and as an attacking left back.

He spent the better part of his early professional career in Portugal with Sporting, where he arrived at only 21. In 2007, he moved to Turkey where he remained several years, notably representing Beşiktaş and Eskişehirspor.

A Chilean international for a full decade, Tello represented the country at the 2010 World Cup and the 2007 Copa América. Currently a Background Designer on Nickelodeon's The Casagrandes.

Club career
Born in Santiago, as a child Tello was with Colo-Colo from 1992 to 1995. Next he moved to Club Universidad de Chile and began his career making his professional debuts in 1999. He quickly made a good impression, being named the best midfielder in the country in 2000 and being transferred to Sporting Clube de Portugal for a fee of €7 million in January of the following year, alongside compatriot Mario Cáceres; at the time, it was a club record for the Primeira Liga side.

After a slow start, Tello eventually became an important first-team member – although he would be used mainly as a substitute – and even saw some time at left back.

In the 2007 summer, Tello moved to Turkey and signed with Beşiktaş J.K., being named to the Team of the Season in his second year as his team won the double. On 25 November 2009, during a UEFA Champions League group stage game against Manchester United, he scored from 25 yards to beat Ben Foster and help to a 1–0 win, the first match in that stage of the competition the English had lost at Old Trafford in eight years.

On 25 July 2010, aged 30, Tello left Beşiktaş but continued in the Süper Lig, signing a three-year contract with Eskişehirspor. In January 2014, he moved to fellow league club Elazığspor, transferring to Şanlıurfaspor of the second division in June.

Tello returned to his country after a 15-year absence, agreeing to a one-year deal at Audax Italiano on 4 August 2015. On 28 April of the following year, the 36-year-old announced his retirement.

International career
A full Chilean international since his early 20s, Tello represented the country at the 2007 Copa América, where the national side exited in the last-eight after a 1–6 loss against eventual winners Brazil, and at the 2010 FIFA World Cup in South Africa, playing in the second half of the round-of-16 0–3 defeat to the same opponents.

He also competed at the 2000 Summer Olympics, winning a bronze medal.

Career statistics

Club
Source:

International goals

Honours

Club
Universidad de Chile
Chilean Primera División: 1999, 2000
Copa Chile: 2000

Sporting
Primeira Liga: 2001–02
Taça de Portugal: 2001–02, 2006–07
Supertaça Cândido de Oliveira: 2000, 2002
UEFA Cup: Runner-up 2004–05

Beşiktaş
Süper Lig: 2008–09
Turkish Cup: 2008–09

International
Chile U23
Summer Olympic Games:  2000

Chile
:

References

External links

Rodrigo Tello at playmakerstats.com (English version of ceroacero.es)

1979 births
Living people
Footballers from Santiago
Chilean footballers
Association football defenders
Association football midfielders
Universidad de Chile footballers
Audax Italiano footballers
Sporting CP footballers
Beşiktaş J.K. footballers
Eskişehirspor footballers
Elazığspor footballers
Şanlıurfaspor footballers
Chilean Primera División players
Primeira Liga players
Süper Lig players
TFF First League players
Olympic footballers of Chile
Footballers at the 2000 Summer Olympics
Olympic medalists in football
Medalists at the 2000 Summer Olympics
Olympic bronze medalists for Chile
Chile international footballers
2007 Copa América players
2010 FIFA World Cup players
Chilean expatriate footballers
Chilean expatriate sportspeople in Portugal
Chilean expatriate sportspeople in Turkey
Expatriate footballers in Portugal
Expatriate footballers in Turkey